Mount Wow is a prominent  mountain summit located in the southwest corner of Mount Rainier National Park, in Pierce County of Washington state. Its nearest higher neighbor is Iron Mountain,  to the east-northeast. Precipitation runoff from Mount Wow is drained by Tahoma Creek on the east side of the mountain, whereas Goat Creek drains the west side of it, and both are tributaries of the Nisqually River.

History
The "wow" name derives from a corruption of a Yakama word meaning "goat", and early tourists would often see mountain goats on this mountain's slopes. The name was officially adopted in 1913 by the United States Board on Geographic Names.

Climate

Mount Wow is located in the marine west coast climate zone of western North America. Most weather fronts originate in the Pacific Ocean, and travel northeast toward the Cascade Mountains. As fronts approach, they are forced upward by the peaks of the Cascade Range (Orographic lift), causing them to drop their moisture in the form of rain or snowfall onto the Cascades. As a result, the west side of the Cascades experiences high precipitation, especially during the winter months in the form of snowfall. During winter months, weather is usually cloudy, but, due to high pressure systems over the Pacific Ocean that intensify during summer months, there is often little or no cloud cover during the summer. The months July through September offer the most favorable weather for viewing or climbing this peak.

See also

 Geology of the Pacific Northwest
 Tumtum Peak

References

Gallery

External links
 National Park Service web site: Mount Rainier National Park
 Mount Wow: weather forecast

Wow
Wow
Wow
Wow
Wow